Adarmalane  also D'adarmalane is a rural commune of the Cercle of Goudam in the Tombouctou Region of Mali. It lies to the south of Lake Faguibine.

References

External links
.

Communes of Tombouctou Region